Operation Fortis could refer to:
Operation Fortis, the investigation into the 2018 Amesbury poisonings
Operation Fortis, the deployment of the United Kingdom Carrier Strike Group 21